Vladyslav Schetinin (born 29 August 1997, in Ukraine) is a professional Ukrainian football defender.

Career
Schetinin is а product of youth team system of FC Chornomorets. Made his debut for FC Chornomorets in the game against FC Karpaty Lviv on 10 May 2015 in the Ukrainian Premier League.

References

External links

Profile at FFU Official Site (Ukr)

1997 births
Living people
Ukrainian footballers
FC Chornomorets Odesa players
Ukrainian Premier League players

Association football defenders
FC Zhemchuzhyna Odesa players
FC Kremin Kremenchuk players